Chalkyitsik (Jałgiitsik  in Gwich'in), meaning "to fish with a hook, at the mouth of the creek", is a census-designated place (CDP) in Yukon-Koyukuk Census Area, Alaska, United States. It is located on the left (south) bank of the Black River, 45 miles northeast of Fort Yukon. At the 2010 census the population was 69, down from 83 in 2000.

Geography
Chalkyitsik is located at  (66.651529, -143.727356).

Chalkystik has a bitter subarctic climate.

Climate 
Chalkyitsik has a continental subarctic climate (Köppen climate classification Dwc) with mild summers and cold winters. Precipitation is very low, but significantly higher in summer than at other times of the year.  A weather station was operated from August 1962 to November 1972; the weather record is thus very sparse.

Education
Yukon Flats School District operates the Tsuk Taih School.

Demographics

Chalkyitsik first appeared as an unincorporated village on the 1930 U.S. Census under the name of Fishhook, which is the literal translation of the native name, not to be confused with the present census-designated place, Fishhook in the Matanuska-Susitna Borough. It appeared again in 1940, but failed to appear in 1950. It was returned in 1960 formally as Chalkyitsik, and has appeared on every successive census. It was made a census-designated place (CDP) in 1980.

As of the census of 2000, there were 83 people, 35 households, and 17 families residing in the CDP. The population density was 9.5 people per square mile (3.7/km2). There were 62 housing units at an average density of 7.1/sq mi (2.7/km2). The racial makeup of the CDP was 2.41% White and 97.59% Native American.

There were 35 households, out of which 25.7% had children under the age of 18 living with them, 28.6% were married couples living together, 2.9% had a female householder with no husband present, and 51.4% were non-families. 37.1% of all households were made up of individuals, and 14.3% had someone living alone who was 65 years of age or older. The average household size was 2.37 and the average family size was 3.29.

In the CDP, the population was spread out, with 27.7% under the age of 18, 13.3% from 18 to 24, 28.9% from 25 to 44, 14.5% from 45 to 64, and 15.7% who were 65 years of age or older. The median age was 33 years. For every 100 females, there were 137.1 males. For every 100 females age 18 and over, there were 185.7 males.

The median income for a household in the CDP was $16,250, and the median income for a family was $16,875. Males had a median income of $41,250 versus $13,750 for females. The per capita income for the CDP was $11,509. There were 54.5% of families and 52.6% of the population living below the poverty line, including 100.0% of under eighteen and none of those over 64.

Transportation
The city is served by Chalkyitsik Airport with one commercial airline. With only 69 residents, Chalkytsik has one of the lowest per-airline averages of residents in the United States.

References

Census-designated places in Alaska
Census-designated places in Unorganized Borough, Alaska
Census-designated places in Yukon–Koyukuk Census Area, Alaska
Gwich'in
Populated places of the Arctic United States